Ye Wenfu is a Chinese poet born in 1944. He worked in the military and was later "struggled" against and criticized by officials. He has been critical of communist policies and officials. He wrote the poem General, you can't do this. Ye was imprisoned for 17 months after the 1989 Tiananmen Square protests and massacre. He contributed to Mao's Harvest: Voices from China's New Generation.

References

1944 births
Living people
Chinese human rights activists
People's Republic of China poets